Alexander the Coppersmith (Greek: Ἀλέξανδρος ὁ χαλκεὺς) is a person in the New Testament, mentioned by Paul in 2 Timothy 4:14, which states, "Alexander the coppersmith did me great harm; the Lord will repay him according to his deeds."

Paul Jeon notes that Alexander "serves almost as an anti-type to Christ," who showed grace to Paul. Aída Besançon Spencer suggests that while "Demas had been a passive opponent (4:9), Alexander was an active opponent".

Some scholars identify him with the Alexander of Acts 19:33, the Alexander of 1 Timothy 1:20, (whom, along with Hymenaeus, Paul "handed over to Satan that they may learn not to blaspheme"), or both. Others suggest, however, that he is called "the coppersmith" in order to distinguish him from others of the same name.

References

Coppersmiths
People in the Pauline epistles
Second Epistle to Timothy